Ascochyta humuli is a plant pathogen that causes leaf spot on hops.

See also
List of Ascochyta species

References

Fungal plant pathogens and diseases
Hop diseases
humuli